Kerstin Jacobsson is a Swedish political sociologist conducting research on democracy issues, the European Union, active labour market policies and social movements. She is a professor in the Department of Sociology and Work Science at the University of Gothenburg.

Education and career
Jacobsson obtained her PhD in sociology in 1997 from Uppsala University in Sweden, writing her thesis on democracy in the European Union.

Scientific research
As a political sociologist, Jacobsson has conducted research on Europeanization and the European Union, with one focus on democracy and another focus on employability and labor market policies. She has also studied social movements, primarily in Sweden and Eastern Europe, including animal rights activists and women's organizations.

Selected publications

Books
 Jacobsson K, Lindblom J. Animal rights activism: A moral-sociological perspective on social movements. Amsterdam University Press, 2016.

Edited books
 Jacobsson K, editor. Urban grassroots movements in Central and Eastern Europe. Farnham: Ashgate, 2015.
 Jacobsson K, Korolczuk E, editors. Civil society revisited: Lessons from Poland. Berghahn Books, 2017.

Scientific articles
 Jacobsson K, Schmid H. Real Integration or Formal Adaptation?: On the Implementation of the National Action Plans for Employment, 2002.
 Borrás S, Jacobsson K. The open method of co-ordination and new governance patterns in the EU. Journal of European Public Policy, 11:185-208, 2004.
 Jacobsson K. Soft regulation and the subtle transformation of states: the case of EU employment policy. Journal of European Social Policy, 14:355-70, 2004.
 Hansson N, Jacobsson K. Learning to be affected: Subjectivity, sense, and sensibility in animal rights activism. Society & Animals, 22:262-88, 2014.
 Karlberg E, Jacobsson K. A meta-organizational perspective on the Europeanization of civil society: The case of the Swedish Women’s Lobby, Voluntas: International Journal of Nonprofit or Voluntary Organizations, 26:1438-1459, 2015.
 Jacobsson K, Hollertz K, Garsten C. Local worlds of activation: the diverse pathways of three Swedish municipalities. Nordic Social Work Research, 7:86-100, 2017.
 Bengtsson M, de la Porte C, Jacobsson K. Labour market policy under conditions of permanent austerity: Any sign of social investment?. Social Policy & Administration. 2017, 51:367-388.

Popular media 
 Jacobsson K. Urban grassroots mobilization in central-east European cities. Open Democracy, May 19, 2015.

References

External links 
 
 University of Gothenburg, Department of Sociology and Work Science, Kerstin Jacobsson

Living people
Swedish sociologists
Swedish women sociologists
Political sociologists
Animal rights scholars
Labor studies scholars
European Union and European integration scholars
Academic staff of the University of Gothenburg
Uppsala University alumni
1966 births
Date of birth missing (living people)
Place of birth missing (living people)
Women political scientists